The International Ombuds Association (IOA) is an organization founded in 2005 with the purpose of supporting organizational ombuds.  It was formed after the merger of the University and College Ombuds Association (UCOA) and The Ombudsman Association (TOA).

Standards of Practice

The IOA has promulgated both Standards of Practice and a code of ethics for Organizational Ombuds; both are founded on the idea that Ombuds are to be confidential, neutral (or impartial), informal, and independent.

Levels of Membership

The IOA has four levels of membership, including members, associate members, affiliate members, and retiree members.  Full membership is granted to practicing Organizational Ombuds who adhere to the IOA's standards of practice and code of ethics, holds no conflicting job functions, and do not serve as an agent of the organization for purposes of notice.  Associate members are practicing Organizational Ombuds who have some other job function which limits the independence, neutrality, confidentiality, or informality of their Ombudsing role, who have no job function which would make them an agent of their organization for the purpose of notice, and who support the IOA standards of practice and code of ethics but may be limited in their ability to adhere to them. Affiliate members are persons or entities that support the IOA standards of practice and code of ethics, but who do not serve as Organizational Ombuds. Retiree members practiced Ombudsry for two years as a member of the IOA, UCOA, or TOA before filing for that status.

The organization has over 500 members from a diverse number of countries and a diverse selection of fields, including government, education, and corporate settings.

References

External links 
 The International Ombuds Association Website
 The IOA Code of Ethics
 The IOA Standards of Practice
 The Ombuds Blog (Promulgated by Tom Kosakowski)
 Asian Ombudsman Association (AOA)

Ombudsman organizations
Professional networks